Bayside Cemetery and Gatehouse Complex is a historic cemetery and gatehouse located at Potsdam in St. Lawrence County, New York. The cemetery was established in 1865 and the gatehouse complex constructed in 1901.  The gatehouse complex is a Châteauesque style, Late Victorian red Potsdam ashlar sandstone building.  It includes a receiving room for the deceased and mourners, quarters for the cemetery custodial family, and a bell tower.  The cemetery includes a number of notable structures and objects including the Clarkson mausoleum (1873), Morgan family obelisk, and Soldiers Monument (1903).

It was listed on the National Register of Historic Places in 2004.

References

External links
 

Cemeteries on the National Register of Historic Places in New York (state)
1865 establishments in New York (state)
Cemeteries in St. Lawrence County, New York
National Register of Historic Places in St. Lawrence County, New York